Christophe de la Fontaine is a Luxembourgish product designer, university professor and co-founder of Dante – Goods and Bads GmbH, German-based furniture and home accessory brand. His work includes furniture and lighting in collaboration with Moroso, Rosenthal, FormAgenda and many others.

Life and work 
Christophe de la Fontaine was born in 1976 in Luxembourg, where he graduated from the Lycée des Arts et Métiers as a sculptor. He continued his studies at the industrial design department of the State Academy of Fine Arts Stuttgart under the supervision of Richard Sapper. Upon graduation in 2002, he collaborated with Therefore - product design consultant in London, followed by Piero Lissoni Associati in Milan. In this period he also collaborated with Stefan Diez on a project which would win the “Design Report Award” in 2002. In Milan he became the head of Studio Patricia Urquiola design department, remaining on the position until 2010. In 2012 he co-founded Dante - Goods and Bads, a furniture and home accessory brand, together with his partner, contemporary artist Aylin Langreuter. The company is today internationally active and features awarded editions. As an independent product designer, he received numerous international awards, including the Red Dot Design Award, the Good Design Award, and the Gold iF Product Design Award. In 2015 he was featured on The Wallpaper* 100, a list of the 'design world’s most powerful players'. Christophe is Rosenthal's most award-winning designer., and his work was endorsed by Luxembourg royalty.

Since 2018 he was appointed professor of industrial design at the State Academy of Fine Arts Stuttgart.

Exhibitions
2015 Brand New World, Milan, Italy
2012 DANTE - Goods & Bads, Side Glance, Galerie Schweitzer, Luxembourg
2011 Prix d’Art Robert Schuman, Cercle Municipal Luxembourg
2011 Trophées, Art Paris Grand Palais
2010 Artfreaks, Workshop MUDAM Luxembourg
2010 Moving Worlds, Triennale Jeune création, Carre Rotondes, Luxembourg
2009 Installation permanante Maison Printz e Richard, Chamber of Deputies (Luxembourg)
2008 ‘Transfert’ at Kiosk by AICA, Luxembourg
2007 Elo. Inner Exile - Outer Limits, MUDAM Luxembourg
2005 Anders als immer, Zeitgenössisches Design und die Macht des Gewohnten
2004 Promosedia, “Caiazza Memorial Challenge” competition for wooden chairs Udine Italy
2003 Spin-off Lounge IMM Cologne, Germany
2002 Salone Satellite 02 Milan Furniture Fair, Italy
2002 St. Etienne Biennale International 02, France
2002‘Wonderwood’ Interieur 02 Kortrjik, Belgium
2002 Instant Lounge Interieur 02 Kortrijk, Belgium
2002 Instant Lounge for ANNO’02 Kortrijk, Belgium
2002 Terminal-nyc during the ICFF NY, US

Awards and juries
2013 German Design Award for 'Format' Rosenthal studio-line, Frankfurt
2013 Jury IF Award, Hannover
2012 IF Gold Award for 'Format' Rosenthal studio-line, Hannover
2012 Design Plus Award for 'Format' Rosenthal studio-line, Frankfurt
2012 Interior Innovation Award for 'Format' Rosenthal studio-line, Cologne
2012 Jury Design Report Award 2012, Milano
2011 Good Design Award for 'Format' Rosenthal studio-line, Chicago
2004 Promosedia, – winner of the "Caiazza Memorial Challenge" competition for wooden chairs Udine
2003 Interior Innovation Award IMM Cologne, winner "best of the best award" for the product "Instant Lounge"
2002 Salone Satellite, winner of the "Design Report Award" Milano

References

External links
 Petra Shmidt, The Design Label Dante, Form Design Magazine, August 2014
 Chiara dal Canto, Modern fairytale, Belle (magazine), November 2014
 Luigina Bolis, Jump, Corriere della Sera Living, October 2014
 Oliver Herwig, Du bist der Boss, Manual, February 2014 
 Lecture on Belgrade Design Week 2013, Aylin Langreuter and Christophe de la Fontaine
Der German Design Award
IF Gold design award
Ciazza Memorial Challenge Award
Design Plus Award
DANTE - Goods and Bads on Bloomberg Business

Industrial designers
Luxembourgian businesspeople
1976 births
Living people